The Southern Brotherhood Militia was founded in Scottsburg, Indiana, in 1928 by James Melvin Bruce. James M. Bruce was a veteran of the Spanish–American War. His fellow army veteran friends had strong feelings for the southern Confederacy, and therefore chose the name Southern Brotherhood. James M. Bruce was murdered on June 6, 1936. This date is significant; it is now known as S.B. day, a holiday for all Southern Brotherhood members and supporters. James M. Bruce's son Melvin Russell Bruce known as "Pop" became president of the Southern Brotherhood. Melvin R. Bruce had established a patriarch system, where friends and family of the original members would lead the newer units created. Melvin died in 1993, passing the leadership role down to his two grandsons. When the two sons took over, they changed the name of the Southern Brotherhood to Southern Brotherhood Militia, because of problems with copycats using the good, well-established name of the Southern Brotherhood.  The SBM has expanded internationally, with units in Northern Ireland, Serbia, Canada and Argentina. It has become one of the largest underground American militia groups; units known as "Wolf-packs" have 21 men, are located in every state in the United States. It is believed they have created over 100 Wolf-packs just in the United States, that are underground cell groups. The Southern Brotherhood Militia operates a nine-region-system in the U.S.,  The SBM created a female-only splinter group called the Southern Belles of SBM.  SBM has never advocated the overthrow of the US Government. They have a very large influence in the American Militia Movement and right-wing groups. SBM has

References

http://www.12news.com/story/news/local/arizona/2015/08/11/farley-bounty-hunter-extremist-militia/31447859/
http://southernbrotherhood.webs.com/
http://scholarworks.iu.edu/journals/index.php/imh/article/view/6407/6535
http://www.lupercemetery.com/History%20of%20the%20Bruce%20Family.pdf
http://www.manta.com/c/mmflfrq/southern-brotherhood-publications

Paramilitary organizations based in the United States
1928 establishments in Indiana